OCPM can stand for:
 In the United States, a podiatric medical school:
 Ohio College of Podiatric Medicine (Now Kent State University College of Podiatric Medicine)
 and United States incorporations and businesses:
 Orthodox Christian Prison Ministry
 Orange County Performance Motorsports
 Our Chronic Pain Mission
 In the State of Ohio – a government HRD program:
 Ohio Certified Public Manager Program
 In Canada – an official agency in Montreal:
 Office de Consultation Publique de Montreal
 Software for Opera (web browser):
 Opera Customizer & Profile Maker